In chess, the Katalymov Variation (also spelled Katalimov) is a less popular line of the Sicilian Defence that begins with the moves:

1. e4 c5
2. Nf3 b6

Discussion
The Katalymov is considered inferior since it commits Black to a plan with ...b6 rather than more aggressive Sicilian defences incorporating ...b7–b5. Black must protect the b5-square, as an invasion by a white knight or bishop would be very annoying. For example, White retains a slight plus after 3.d4 cxd4 4.Nxd4 Bb7 5.Nc3 a6 6.Bd3 g6 7.f4 Bg7 8.Nf3 d6 9.0-0 Nf6 10.Qe1 0-0 11.Qh4 Nbd7 12.Bd2.

The opening is a favorite of French GM Christian Bauer, with which he managed to draw a game in 2005 against currently top-ranked GM Magnus Carlsen. It has also been used by top players such as Gata Kamsky, Russian GM Pavel Ponkratov and Soviet GM Lev Psakhis.

The opening is named after Soviet IM Boris Katalymov (1932–2013).

See also
 List of chess openings
 List of chess openings named after people

References

Bibliography

Chess openings